The Keiskamma River is a river in the Eastern Cape Province in South Africa. The river flows into the Indian Ocean in the Keiskamma Estuary, located by Hamburg Nature Reserve, near Hamburg, midway between East London and Port Alfred. The Keiskamma flows first in a southwestern and then in a southeastern direction after meeting its main tributary, the Tyhume River.

The Keiskamma River marked the border between the Cape Province and former British Kaffraria, known also then as Queen Adelaide's Province, until 1847.

Presently this river is part of the Mzimvubu to Keiskamma Water Management Area.

Ecology
There is a small population of the endangered Eastern Province rocky (Sandelia bainsii) in the Tyhume River, part of the Keiskamma river basin.

Dams
Sandile Dam

See also 
 List of rivers of South Africa
List of estuaries of South Africa

References

External links
Keiskamma River Catchment (South Africa)
Towns of historical interest in the 'kei
Cape slavery heritage 
The carcass of Huberta, the Keiskamma River Hippopotamus (Apr 1931)

Rivers of the Eastern Cape
Internal borders of South Africa